Moyale District is a former administrative district in the former Eastern Province of Kenya. Its capital town was Moyale. It had population of 53,479 and an area of 9,390 km² . The district had only one local authority, Moyale county council. The district had one electoral constituency, the Moyale Constituency.

References

External links 
 Moyale District Profile

 
Former districts of Kenya